Dr. Mansor bin Abd Rahman is a Malaysian politician. He was the former Member of the Parliament of Malaysia for the seat of Sik, Kedah, representing the United Malays National Organisation (UMNO) in Malaysia's previous governing Barisan Nasional (BN) coalition.

A medical doctor by profession, Mansor entered Parliament at the 2013 election. At the time of his election he was the deputy chief of UMNO's Sik division. He defeated the incumbent Pan-Malaysian Islamic Party (PAS) MP, Che Uda Che Nik.

In the 2018 election, Mansor lost to Ahmad Tarmizi Sulaiman of PAS, in a three-corner fight with Azli Che Uda of Parti Amanah Negara (AMANAH) for the Sik parliamentary seat.

Election results

References

Year of birth missing (living people)
Living people
People from Kedah
Malaysian people of Malay descent
Malaysian Muslims
Malaysian medical doctors
United Malays National Organisation politicians
Members of the Dewan Rakyat
21st-century Malaysian politicians